Essex Terminal Railway  (often referred to as ETR) is a Canadian shortline terminal railroad, running from the City of Windsor, Ontario through LaSalle, to Amherstburg, Ontario, for a distance of approximately . ETR has direct connections to Canadian Pacific Railway, Canadian National Railway and CSX. ETR is owned by Essex Morterm Holdings. Founded in 1902, it is one of the oldest existing railways in Canada .

History 
The railway was founded in 1902 as a western connection of the Grand Trunk Railway (now Canadian National Railway) to factories in the east end of Windsor. Construction of the line took place between 1902 and 1918. During World War II, the trains hauled military and industrial equipment (e.g. Bren Gun carriers, and trucks) from Ford Windsor and other industries, to interchanges with Canadian National and Canadian Pacific railways. New York Central, Pere Marquette, and Wabash Railways. Its four-stall engine house and main offices are located on Lincoln Road. Due to heavy development along much of the mainline and almost 40 level crossings along ETR's entire route, trains often operate at around 10 mph. The approach to River Canard and Long Marsh bridges is limited to 5 mph.

As a part of the urban renewal of Windsor, the railway sold several kilometers of spur line in central Windsor to the City of Windsor and various developers in 1998, allowing new homes and businesses to be built along the former rail. The main line was generally unchanged however ETR became more dependent on down river traffic and several upgrades were made.

In September 2002, ETR celebrated its 100th anniversary and brought its newly restored 1923 Number 9 0-6-0 locomotive down from St. Thomas, Ontario. The company was loaned several 1930s CPR and CN passenger cars to give rides to nearby residents that celebrated with the company. Number 9 currently operates out of Waterloo, Ontario.
A week after the centennial celebration, the ETR had its first serious derailment in decades, caused by abnormally heavy rains. Cars carrying soybeans were involved. There were no injuries, the tracks were repaired and two nearby grade crossings repaved.

In early 2013, a connection was made so that ETR could provide service to the Hiram Walkers tank farm just west of the Via Rail Walkerville Station. Ex-CN rail track is accessed (stopping short of George Ave.) but is not connected to the VIA mainline. It is now the only active track to cross Walker Rd near Riverside Dr, after the VIA station tracks were terminated east of Walker.

In 2017, ETR purchased the former General Motors plant property in south Walkerville and renovated into a automotive logistics yard for new Chrysler vehicles that await shipment. The site is run under the name MotiPark, and is owned by Essex Morterm Holdings.

As of 2020, the ETR services 9 customers, including ADM and Plains Midsteam, and often handles hundreds of railcars every day. Ojibway yard is used as a central location for switching operations and car storage, with other smaller storage yards located in both west and east Windsor. Diageo and the former Honeywell/General Chemical property, which also used for railcar storage, is located in Amherstburg at the southern end of the line.

In 2023, Windsor residents complained of excessive and disruptive train whistle noise produced by ETR on a daily basis, starting in October of the previous year.

ETR locomotives and rolling stock 

The ETR currently has 4 units on the roster. They are 104 (ex-ICG SW14), 105 (GMD SW9), 107 (EMD SW1500) and 108 (GMD GP9)

ETR has several pieces of rolling stock used for storage; a covered hopper and a boxcar are on-trucks but stationary at the engine facility on Lincoln Rd.

They had two ex-CP wide vision cabooses which have been sold to Waterloo Central Railroad and were renumbered from ETR 1610 to WCRX 1040 and ETR 1600 to WCRX 1042.

The cabooses departed August 14 for London.  They are routed to Sarnia according to a source.  Branchline Magazine reports one is supposed to be Waterloo bound while the other is Sarnia bound.

The ETR now no longer has cabooses on the roster.

References

External links 
 ETR official website
 ETR Rolling Stock GIF Images at Trainweb.org
 Southwest Ontario Train at TrainWeb.org
 ETR train paint schemes

Rail transport in Essex County, Ontario
Rail transport in Windsor, Ontario
Ontario railways
Railway lines opened in 1902
1902 establishments in Ontario